HMS Clacton was a  built for the Royal Navy during the Second World War.

Design and description
The Bangor class was designed as a small minesweeper that could be easily built in large numbers by civilian shipyards; as steam turbines were difficult to manufacture, the ships were designed to accept a wide variety of engines. The ship's complement consisted of 60 officers and ratings.

She was powered by two Parsons geared steam turbines, each driving one shaft, using steam provided by two Admiralty three-drum boilers.

The turbine-powered Bangors were armed with a  anti-aircraft gun and a single QF 2-pounder (4 cm) AA gun. In some ships the 2-pounder was replaced a single or twin  20 mm Oerlikon AA gun, while most ships were fitted with four additional single Oerlikon mounts over the course of the war. For escort work, her minesweeping gear could be exchanged for around 40 depth charges.

Construction and career
HMS Clacton was built by Ailsa Shipbuilding Co. Ltd., at Troon, Scotland and launched on 18 December 1941. Thus far she has been only the second ship of the Royal Navy named after the Essex town of Clacton-on-Sea. HMS Clacton was in the Mediterranean off the east coast of Corsica, on passage from La Maddalena to Bastia on 31 December 1943.  She struck a mine at 0832 hours and sank immediately. Three officers and 29 ratings were killed, with the survivors being rescued by HMS Polruan.

References

Bibliography

External links
 HMS Clacton at Uboat.net
  World naval ships - losses

 

Bangor-class minesweepers of the Royal Navy
Ships built on the River Clyde
1941 ships
World War II minesweepers of the United Kingdom
Ships sunk by mines
Maritime incidents in December 1943
World War II shipwrecks in the Mediterranean Sea